This list of amphibians recorded in Japan is primarily based on the IUCN Red List, which details the conservation status of some ninety-three species. Of these, four are assessed as critically endangered (the endemic Amakusa salamander, Mikawa salamander, Tosashimizu salamander, and Tsukuba clawed salamander), twenty-seven as endangered, thirteen as vulnerable, eleven as near threatened, and thirty-eight as of least concern.

According to statistics accompanying the 2020 Japanese Ministry of the Environment (MoE) Red List, ninety-one species and subspecies are to be found, but the conservation status of only sixty-seven is detailed. Of these, five taxa are critically endangered from a national perspective, twenty are endangered, twenty-two vulnerable, nineteen near threatened, and one data deficient.

As of January 2021, for their protection, fourteen species have been designated National Endangered Species by Cabinet Order in accordance with the 1992 Act on Conservation of Endangered Species of Wild Fauna and Flora.

Order: Anura (frogs) 

Family: Bufonidae
Genus: Bufo
Asiatic toad, Bufo gargarizans 
Miyako toad, B. g. miyakonis(endemic subspecies) (MoE: NT)
Japanese common toad, Bufo japonicus (endemic)
Japanese stream toad, Bufo torrenticola (endemic)
Genus: Rhinella
Cane toad, Rhinella marina (introduced)
Family: Dicroglossidae
Genus: Fejervarya
Indian rice frog, Fejervarya limnocharis 
Marsh frog, Fejervarya kawamurai
Sakishima rice frog, Fejervarya sakishimensis 
Genus: Limnonectes
Namie's frog, Limnonectes namiyei (endemic)
Family: Hylidae
Genus: Dryophytes
Japanese tree frog, Dryophytes japonicus 
Genus: Hyla
Hallowell's tree frog, Hyla hallowellii (endemic)
Family: Microhylidae
Genus: Microhyla
, Microhyla okinavensis (endemic)
Yaeyama narrow-mouthed toad, Microhyla kuramotoi (endemic)
Family: Pipidae
Genus: Xenopus
African clawed frog, Xenopus laevis (introduced)
Family: Ranidae
Genus: Babina
Holst's frog, Babina holsti (endemic)
Otton frog, Babina subaspera (endemic)
Genus: Glandirana
Japanese wrinkled frog, Glandirana rugosa (endemic)
Sado wrinkled frog, Glandirana susurra (endemic)
Genus: Lithobates
American bullfrog, Lithobates catesbeianus (introduced)
Genus: Nidirana
Yaeyama harpist frog, Nidirana okinavana  |(endemic)
Genus: Odorrana
, Odorrana splendida (endemic)
Amami tip-nosed frog, Odorrana amamiensis (endemic)
Greater tip-nosed frog, Odorrana supranarina (endemic)
Ishikawa's frog, Odorrana ishikawae (endemic)
Ryukyu tip-nosed frog, Odorrana narina (endemic)
Utsunomiya's tip-nosed frog, Odorrana utsunomiyaorum (endemic)
Genus: Pelophylax
Black-spotted pond frog, Pelophylax nigromaculatus  
Daruma pond frog, Pelophylax porosus 
Nagoya Daruma pond frog, P. p. brevipodus(endemic subspecies) (MoE: EN)
Tokyo Daruma pond frog, P. p. porosus(endemic subspecies) (MoE: NT)
Genus: Rana
Dybowski's frog, Rana dybowskii 
Ezo brown frog, Rana pirica 
Japanese brown frog, Rana japonica (endemic)
Montane brown frog, Rana ornativentris (endemic)
, Rana neba (endemic)
, Rana ulma (endemic)
Ryukyu brown frog, Rana kobai (endemic)
Stream brown frog, Rana sakuraii (endemic)
Tago's brown frog, Rana tagoi (endemic)
Oki Tago's brown frog, R. t. okiensis (MoE: NT)
Yakushima Tago's brown frog, R. t. yakushimensis (MoE: NT)
Tsushima brown frog, Rana tsushimensis (endemic)
Family: Rhacophoridae
Genus: Buergeria
Kajika frog, Buergeria buergeri  (endemic)
Ryukyu kajika frog, Buergeria japonica (endemic)
Yaeyama kajika frog, Buergeria choui 
Genus: Polypedates
Common tree frog, Polypedates leucomystax (introduced)
Genus: Kurixalus
Eiffinger's tree frog, Kurixalus eiffingeri 
Genus: Zhangixalus
Amami green tree frog, Zhangixalus amamiensis (endemic)
Forest green tree frog, Zhangixalus arboreus (endemic)
Okinawa green tree frog, Zhangixalus viridis (endemic)
Owston's green tree frog, Zhangixalus owstoni (endemic)
Schlegel's green tree frog, Zhangixalus schlegelii (endemic)

Order: Caudata (salamanders) 

Family: Cryptobranchidae
Genus: Andrias
Chinese giant salamander Andrias davidianus (introduced)
Japanese giant salamander, Andrias japonicus (endemic)
Family: Hynobiidae
Genus: Hynobius
Abe's salamander, Hynobius abei (endemic) (MoE: CR)
Abu salamander, Hynobius abuensis (endemic)
Aki salamander, Hynobius akiensis (endemic)
, Hynobius amakusaensis (endemic)  (MoE: CR)
Chikushi-buchi salamander, Hynobius oyamai (endemic)
Chūgoku-buchi salamander, Hynobius sematonotos (endemic)
Ezo salamander, Hynobius retardatus (endemic) (MoE: DD)
Blotched salamander, Hynobius naevius (endemic)
Hakuba salamander, Hynobius hidamontanus (endemic)
Hida salamander, Hynobius kimurae (endemic)
Highland salamander, Hynobius utsunomiyaorum (endemic)
Hokuriku salamander, Hynobius takedai (endemic)
, Hynobius hirosei (endemic)
Iwami salamander, Hynobius iwami (endemic)
Iyoshima salamander, Hynobius kuishiensis (endemic)
Japanese black salamander, Hynobius nigrescens (endemic)
, Hynobius fossigenus (endemic)
Kato's salamander, Hynobius katoi (endemic)
Mahoroba salamander, Hynobius guttatus (endemic)
, Hynobius mikawaensis (endemic) (MoE: CR)
Mitsjama salamander, Hynobius nebulosus (endemic)
Ōdaigahara salamander, Hynobius boulengeri (endemic)
Ōita salamander, Hynobius dunni (endemic)
Oki salamander, Hynobius okiensis (endemic)
, Hynobius osumiensis (endemic)
San'in salamander, Hynobius setoi (endemic)
Setouchi salamander, Hynobius setouchi (endemic)
Smaller blotched salamander, Hynobius stejnegeri (endemic)
, Hynobius shinichisatoi (endemic)
Stejneger's oriental salamander, Hynobius ikioi (endemic)
Tōhoku salamander, Hynobius lichenatus (endemic)
Tokyo salamander, Hynobius tokyoensis (endemic)
Tosashimizu salamander, Hynobius tosashimizuensis (endemic) (MoE: CR)
Tsurugi salamander, Hynobius tsurugiensis (endemic)
Tsushima salamander, Hynobius tsuensis (endemic)
Yamaguchi salamander, Hynobius bakan (endemic)
Yamato salamander, Hynobius vandenburghi (endemic)
Genus: Onychodactylus
, Onychodactylus intermedius (endemic)
Japanese clawed salamander, Onychodactylus japonicus (endemic)
, Onychodactylus kinneburi (endemic)
Tadami clawed salamander, Onychodactylus fuscus (endemic)
, Onychodactylus nipponoborealis (endemic)
, Onychodactylus tsukubaensis (endemic) (MoE: CR)
Genus: Salamandrella
Siberian salamander, Salamandrella keyserlingii 
Family: Salamandridae
Genus: Cynops
Japanese fire belly newt, Cynops pyrrhogaster (endemic)
Sword-tail newt, Cynops ensicauda (endemic)
Genus: Echinotriton
Anderson's crocodile newt, Echinotriton andersoni

Japanese names

See also
 List of animals in Japan 
 Wildlife Protection Areas in Japan

References

External links
 Invasive Species of Japan: Amphibians

Amphibians
Japan
Japan